Kaanapponnu is a Malayalam novel written by dual writers, Parappurath and K. Surendran.  The novel was published in December 1982 by the literary workers co-operative society. The novel is a novel by dual writers. After the death of Parappurath, the non-completed novel was completed by Surendran.

Story line 
A beautiful girl named Ribba, from a wealthy family, has to be so humbly married to a non-beautiful young man named Thomas Kutty, with a certain situation. The reluctance of Reeba to Thomas, Reeba creates tensions in their marriage life. Later, Reeba, whose familiarity with Thomas Kutty's beautiful Sunaramanayana Rao, knows the beauty of the minds of Thomas Kutty.

History of the novel 
Parappuram committed to write a novel as series in Deepika's weekly and he began. Unfortunately, the work couldn't completed because of his death. After his death, K. Surendran, a family friend of Parappuram continued and fulfilled the work with the help of Sangeetha, the youngest daughter of Parappurath.

References

External links 
 പാറപ്പുറത്ത്
 അരനാഴികനേരത്തിന് അര നൂറ്റാണ്ട്
 Puzha Books

Malayalam novels